Anopterus macleayanus, commonly known as  Queensland laurel or Macleay laurel, is a shrub or small tree in the family Escalloniaceae. It is native to Queensland and New South Wales in Australia.

The species was formally described in 1859 by botanist Ferdinand von Mueller, having been collected from the summit of Mt Lindesay. It was named in honour of Sir William Macleay. It is one of two species that belong to the genus Anopterus.

The juvenile leaves may be considerably larger. The petioles and leaf bases are red-tinged. The white flowers occur in racemes between October and December (mid spring to early summer) in its native range.

Anopterus macleayanus is a plant of warm-temperate and subtropical rainforest from the Comboyne Plateau in New South Wales northwards into Queensland.

The thrips species Thrips setipennis was recovered from the flowers of Anopterus macleayanus, suggesting it may be a pollinator.

Its long leaves with wavy margins and red-pink highlights give it horticultural potential. Anopterus macleayanus grows best in part-shaded positions  in well-drained soil in the garden, with added water during the summer. As a rainforest floor plant, it requires a sheltered position when becoming established in the garden. It is resilient but can be slow-growing. It can be grown in containers, even as an indoor plant.

References

Asterids of Australia
Flora of New South Wales
Flora of Queensland
Trees of Australia
Escalloniaceae